The commune of Rango is a commune of Kayanza Province in northern Burundi. The capital lies at Rango.

References

Communes of Burundi
Kayanza Province